Pigeon Island may refer to:

 Pigeon Island (Houtman Abrolhos), Australia
 Pigeon Island (North Queensland), Australia
 Pigeon Island (Lake Ontario), Canada
 Pigeon Island, near Horse Chops Island, Labrador, Canada
 Pigeon Island (Grenadines)
 Pigeon Island (New Zealand)
 Pigeon Island (Saint Lucia)
 Pigeon Island (Solomon Islands)
 Pigeon Island National Park, Sri Lanka
 Güvercinada, Turkey
 Isla de Las Palomas, Spain
 Motueka Island (Pigeon Island), New Zealand
 Netrani Island, or Pigeon Island, Karnataka, India

See also
 Pigeon Key, a small island in Florida, U.S.
 Pidgeon Island, Antarctica